Craugastor pelorus is a species of frog in the family Craugastoridae.

It is endemic to Mexico.
Its natural habitats are subtropical or tropical moist lowland forests, subtropical or tropical moist montane forests, and intermittent rivers.
It is threatened by habitat loss.

Sources

pelorus
Amphibians described in 2000
Taxonomy articles created by Polbot